Alexander Wilhelm Gadolin (8 July 1868, in Borgå landskommun – 2 June 1939) was a Finnish legal scholar and politician. He was a member of the Diet of Finland in 1894 and from 1899 to 1906 and of the Parliament of Finland from 1913 to 1916, representing the Swedish People's Party of Finland (SFP).

References

1868 births
1939 deaths
People from Porvoo
People from Uusimaa Province (Grand Duchy of Finland)
Swedish People's Party of Finland politicians
Members of the Diet of Finland
Members of the Parliament of Finland (1913–16)
Finnish legal scholars
University of Helsinki alumni
Academic staff of the University of Helsinki